The Hamble School is a secondary school in Hamble-le-Rice, offering education to children between 11-16.

Ofsted
The school was inspected by Ofsted in November 2001, when the quality of teaching received an overall "good" for both Years 7-9 and 10-11.

Since then, a number of renovations have taken place, including increasing the facilities, earning the school its Sports College status. Recent site improvements include a Gymnastics Complex (opened in 2006) and a dedicated Humanities (History, Religious Education and Geography) block.

In 2007 the school was inspected by Ofsted again and received another "good" ranking overall. In 2012, the school received a "satisfactory" ranking, generally needing improvement in teaching and behavior.

Notable alumni

 Danny Ings - footballer, Southampton F.C.
 Dani King - cyclist (Women's Team Pursuit World Champion 2011, 2012 and 2013; Women's Team Pursuit Gold Medallist at London 2012)

References

External links
 Hamble College website
 The school on Ofsted's website

Secondary schools in Hampshire
Community schools in Hampshire
Sport schools in the United Kingdom
Specialist sports colleges in England